Srđan "Žika" Todorović (born 28 March 1965) is a Serbian actor and musician. He has played in numerous bands, including Ekatarina Velika, Disciplina Kičme, Radnička Kontrola and Bezobrazno Zeleno.

Srđan is the son of Serbian actor Bora Todorović and his first wife Snežana Matić. He is married to Ana, with whom he had a son Dejan who died in late 2017 at three years of age.

Discography

With Radnička Kontrola 
 "Dosada" / "TV u koloru" (1981)

With Bezobrazno Zeleno 
 1 (1983)

With Disciplina Kičme 
 Sviđa mi se da ti ne bude prijatno (1983)
 Ja imam šarene oči (1985) (EP)
 Svi za mnom! (1986)
 Dečija pesma (1988) (EP, guest appearance)

With Ekatarina Velika 
 Ljubav (1987)
 Samo par godina za nas (1989)
 Neko nas posmatra (1993, guest appearance)
 Kao u snu – Live '91 (2001, live, guest appearance)

With Kazna Za Uši 
 3 (1994, split album, guest appearance)
 Izliv radosti napad sreće (1994)

With Partibrejkers 
 Kiselo i slatko (1994)

With Električni Orgazam 
 Zašto da ne! (1994)
 A um bum (1999) (guest appearance)
 Najbolje pesme vol. 2 1992-1999 (compilation, tracks from Zašto da ne!)

With Plejboj 
 "Zajedno" (1995) (single, guest appearance)

Filmography

References

External links
 
 Srđan Todorović at Discogs

Serbian male film actors
Serbian rock drummers
Serbian punk rock musicians
Yugoslav male film actors
1965 births
Living people
Male actors from Belgrade
20th-century Serbian male actors
21st-century Serbian male actors
Musicians from Belgrade